The Singsaas Lutheran Church is a church in rural Brookings County, South Dakota. It is situated 3 miles northwest of the community of Hendricks, Minnesota.   It was added to the National Register of Historic Places in 2003.

The church was built in Late Gothic Revival style during 1921. It was named for the district of Singsås in the valley of Gauldalen,  in Sør-Trøndelag, Norway, from which many of the original congregation had immigrated.

See also
Singsås Church

References

Lutheran churches in South Dakota
Churches on the National Register of Historic Places in South Dakota
Gothic Revival church buildings in South Dakota
Churches completed in 1921
Churches in Brookings County, South Dakota
Norwegian-American culture in South Dakota
National Register of Historic Places in Brookings County, South Dakota